Any Questions for Ben? is a 2012 Australian comedy film created by Working Dog Productions, directed by Rob Sitch. It stars Josh Lawson, Rachael Taylor, Felicity Ward, Daniel Henshall, and Christian Clark. It was written by Santo Cilauro, Tom Gleisner, and Rob Sitch.

Plot
When high-flying 27-year-old Melbourne-based brand manager Ben (Josh Lawson) returns to his old high school to talk to students about careers, he reunites with other former students, including international human rights lawyer Alex (Rachael Taylor), now working with the United Nations in Yemen, and Olympic archery medallist Jim (Ed Kavalee). Ben soon realises that compared to the other speakers, no one is interested in what a brand manager does, and when questions are asked for, all are directed at the other presenters, while Ben gets none. This causes Ben to begin to consider the meaning behind his current lifestyle, and commences a year-long reevaluation of his priorities, looking in all the wrong places, but ultimately involving the gradual pursuit of Alex as a serious love interest for the first time in his life.

Cast
Josh Lawson as Ben
Rachael Taylor as Alex
Daniel Henshall as Nick
Felicity Ward as Emily
Christian Clark as Andy
Lachy Hulme as Sam
Ed Kavalee as Jim
David James as Malcolm
Jodi Gordon as Kelly
Rob Carlton as Ben's dad
Tracy Mann as Ben's mum
Alan Brough as Ken
Liliya May as Katerina Sinova
Chantelle Raleigh as Fleur
Claudia Hruschka as Aleesha
Emma-Louise Wilson as Katey
Rob Sitch as Principal
Sean Lynch as Balloon Assistant
John Howard as priest

Theatrical release
The film was released on 9 February 2012. It posted a modest opening weekend at the local box office, which grossed $608,731 for Roadshow on 235 screens, giving it a screen average of $2,590.
By the end of the first week, the film had grossed only A$917,000. By the end of its cinema run in Australia, the film had grossed only A$1.53 million, leaving the film a box-office failure when compared to the previous two feature films produced by Working Dog, namely The Castle (1997) which earned over $10 million and The Dish (2000) which grossed almost $18 million. Overall, the film ranked 102 on the list of most successful films at the Australian box office in 2012.

Reception
The film received lukewarm reviews.
Leigh Paatsch, writing in the Melbourne Herald-Sun, felt that the film's strongest point was the banter between the characters, which was funny and engaging, but Paatsch said that Lawson's central performance was marred at times by "an air of self-satisfied smarm" and the character's path to enlightenment was unfocused and unconvincing. He concluded, "And I sense that others who similarly fell hard for the soulful sincerity of The Castle and The Dish will feel a little quizzical about the comparative slickness of Any Questions for Ben? ".

Tom Ryan in the Sydney Morning Herald wrote that the film was often very funny and singled out Rachael Taylor's performance for praise – "the camera loves her". As a romance, though, Ryan felt that film failed to convince. "The problem for the film-makers is maintaining dramatic interest whilst he [central character Ben] sorts out his quarter-life crisis. Their solutions, alas, aren't especially satisfying. And the endless montages of Melbourne [...] make our city look beautiful [...] but contribute nothing."

Sandra Hall, in the Melbourne Age, said that the film was bright and shiny and made Melbourne appear "dressed up in candy colours", but the film's attempts to generate humour were laboured and desperate, with an over-reliance on musical montages. "The whole thing made me nostalgic for Working Dog's sharper days".

Luke Buckmaster, writing on Crikey, was scathing in his review, saying the film had "blobs of writer's block offal masquerading as a storyline" along with an implausible relationship at its centre with no emotional connection between the two leads. "Working Dog have made precisely that – a dog".

However, Jim Schembri, also writing in the Age, praised the film as "very enjoyable, character-rich, and thoughtful".

References

External links

 

2012 films
Australian comedy films
2012 comedy films
Films set in Melbourne
Films shot in Sydney
Films shot in Melbourne
2010s English-language films